Martha Hyer (August 10, 1924 – May 31, 2014) was an American actress who played Gwen French in Some Came Running (1958), for which she was nominated for the Academy Award for Best Supporting Actress. Her autobiography, Finding My Way: A Hollywood Memoir, was published in 1990.

Early and personal life
Martha Hyer was born in Fort Worth, Texas, into a wealthy family, the daughter of Julien Capers Hyer, an attorney and judge, and Agnes Rebecca (née Barnhart). She was the middle of three sisters, with Agnes Ann and Jeanne. The Hyers were active in the Methodist church, where her father was a highly respected Sunday school teacher. Hyer graduated from Arlington Heights High School and then from Northwestern University with a degree in drama. She was in the sorority Pi Beta Phi with actress Patricia Neal. She then moved to California to study at the Pasadena Playhouse, and soon after was signed to a film contract with RKO. She was married twice, first to producer C. Ray Stahl and later to producer Hal B. Wallis. She converted to Judaism, Wallis's religion, after their marriage. Wallis and Hyer remained together until his death in 1986. Hyer and Wallis contributed funds towards the construction of The Hal and Martha Hyer Wallis Theatre, a black box theater, at Northwestern University. She had no children.

Film and television

Hyer's first film appearance was an uncredited speaking part in The Locket (1946). She appeared in uncredited and bit roles in B-movies for the next few years, occasionally working on television, as well. Eventually, she moved up the ranks, and starting in 1954, began receiving better roles, becoming a popular actress in Hollywood for the next decade.

Hyer had a supporting role in the drama So Big (1953), which stars Jane Wyman, and was directed by Robert Wise. She appeared as Janie in Abbott and Costello Go To Mars (also 1953).  Hyer followed this with Westerns, Wyoming Renegades (1954) and The Battle of Rogue River (1954), and a musical comedy, Lucky Me (1954), which stars Doris Day. She then played Elizabeth Tyson, a socialite who almost loses her fiancé (William Holden) to Audrey Hepburn, in the Oscar-winning film Sabrina (1954). She next starred opposite Donald O'Connor in the comedy Francis in the Navy (1955) and in a 1956 televised version of Jezebel for Lux Video Theatre in which she played the lead role of Julie.

She had supporting roles in the war story Battle Hymn (1957) with Rock Hudson and in the drama Mister Cory (1957) with Tony Curtis, directed by Blake Edwards. She was featured in Kelly and Me, a comedy with Van Johnson, and as Cornelia Bullock in the 1957 remake of My Man Godfrey with David Niven. In 1958, Hyer appeared in a Playhouse 90 televised version of Reunion by Merle Miller, along with Frances Farmer. She next appeared in Paris Holiday (1958) with Bob Hope and Houseboat (1958) with Cary Grant. Hyer was the foil for soon-to-be TV icons Dan Rowan and Dick Martin of Rowan & Martin's Laugh-In fame in their Once Upon a Horse... (1958) Western film by Hal Kanter. For the 1958 drama Some Came Running, directed by Vincente Minnelli, Hyer was nominated for the Academy Award for Best Supporting Actress.

Soon after, she had supporting roles in The Big Fisherman (1959) and The Best of Everything (1959) with Joan Crawford.  Also in 1959 Martha played the role of Hannah Haley in Rawhide (TV series) S1 Ep 8 Incident West Of Lano.

Hyer started the 1960s with a supporting role in Ice Palace (1960), a drama with Richard Burton, and The Last Time I Saw Archie (1961), a comedy with Robert Mitchum. Next she was in A Girl Named Tamiko (1962), Wives and Lovers, and The Carpetbaggers (1964).

By 1964, Hyer had turned 40 and after a decade of success,  began having trouble finding good roles, and worked mainly in television and in European and American B-films. She did appear in two episodes of The Alfred Hitchcock Hour, ('"A Piece Of Action" in 1962 and "Crimson Witness" in 1965). Also in 1965, she was in The Sons of Katie Elder, a Western with John Wayne and Dean Martin. She guest-starred on the television series Bewitched as Margaret Marshall, a wealthy, seductive woman.

In 1966, she was in The Chase, directed by Arthur Penn and starring Marlon Brando and Robert Redford. On television, she guest-starred on The Beverly Hillbillies in the episode "The Richest Woman", in which she plays Tracy Richards, the world's richest woman. In the late 1960s, she starred in the film drama Some May Live, the crime comedy The Happening, and the suspense film Crossplot. In 1967, she guest-starred on Family Affair in the episode "Star Dust", in which she plays Carol Haven, a movie star.

Her final film role was in The Day of the Wolves (1971) and her final television role was in a 1974 episode of McCloud. At age 50, she retired from acting, although she later wrote the screenplay to the 1975 Western Rooster Cogburn, starring John Wayne and Katharine Hepburn.

Retirement and death
Hyer enjoyed a quiet retirement through the 1980s and 1990s. She died on May 31, 2014, at the age of 89 from natural causes in Santa Fe, New Mexico, where she had lived for many years.

Selected filmography

References

External links

 
 
 

1924 births
2014 deaths
Actresses from Texas
American film actresses
American television actresses
Burials at Forest Lawn Memorial Park (Glendale)
Northwestern University School of Communication alumni
People from Fort Worth, Texas
20th-century American actresses
Converts to Judaism from Methodism
Jewish American actresses
Jewish American writers
Jewish women writers
American women memoirists
American memoirists
21st-century American Jews
21st-century American women